Loštice is a town in Šumperk District in the Olomouc Region of the Czech Republic. It has about 2,900 inhabitants.

Administrative parts
The village of Žádlovice is an administrative part of Loštice.

Geography
It lies on the border between the Zábřeh Highlands and Mohelnice Depression. The Třebůvka River flows through the town.

History

The first written mention of Loštice is from 1267, in a deed of bishop Bruno von Schauenburg. Loštice was probably promoted to a town in 1353. In 1414, Loštice was acquired by Boček II of Poděbrady as a part of the Bouzov estate. After his death, the estate was owned by Victor of Kunštát and Poděbrady and then by George of Poděbrady, who administered the estate since 1444.

The presence of Jews is first documented in 1544. In 1554, a Jewish cemetery was established, and the synagogue was built in 1571. From 1581 to 1850, the Jewish community was independent of town administration. The community perished as a result of the Holocaust.

Economy
Loštice's is known for its production of aromatic cheese called Olomoucké tvarůžky.

Transport
The D35 motorway runs next to the town.

Sights

Among the most significant monuments belongs the former synagogue, today a library and a small museum, and the Church of Saint Procopius. The church with the late Gothic core was rebuilt to its current Neoclassical form at the end of the 18th century.

In Žádlovice is a late Baroque castle with a landscape park.

Since 2014, the museum of Olomoucké tvarůžky has been opened in Loštice.

Notable people
Abraham Neuda (1812–1854), Austrian rabbi
Fanny Neuda (1819–1894), writer; lived and worked here
Asriel Günzig (1868–1931), Polish rabbi; served as the rabbi of Loštice in 1899–1920

See also
Loštice pottery

References

External links

Cities and towns in the Czech Republic
Populated places in Šumperk District